Guy Rewenig (born 31 August 1947) is a Luxembourg author and novelist. In 1984, he wrote the first novel in the Luxembourgish language although poems and theatrical works had appeared in the 19th century. Together with Roger Manderscheid, he is credited for initiating the current trend for novels written in Luxemburgish.

Biography

Born on 31 August 1947 in Luxembourg City, Rewenig completed his secondary school education at the Athénée de Luxembourg before being trained as a schoolteacher at the Institut pédagogique. He taught first in the primary school at Bettembourg and from 1971 in Esch-sur-Alzette. In 1984, he gave up teaching to become a full-time independent writer and moved to Nospelt.

Career as a writer

In 1963, Rewenig published his first film reviews in the Luxemburger Wort. His first play "Interview" appeared in 1970 as did Als der Feigenbaum verdorrte, a collection of essays. From 1973, he also began to write for children, his highly successful collection of children's stories Muschkilusch. Geschichte fir Kanner appearing in 1990. In 1985, Guy Rewenig published Hannert dem Atlantik, the very first novel to appear in Luxembourgish, paving the way for other works of fiction to be written in the local language. Rewenig writes in German, Luxembourgish and French. His novel Roman Mass mat dräi Hären was translated into French by Jean Portante  as La cathédrale en flammes. He has also written many satirical works criticizing the social and political shortcomings of Luxembourg life and has frequently contributed articles to Luxembourg newspapers and periodicals.

In 1974, he was a founding member of the Association de soutien aux travailleurs immigrés and in 2000, together with Roger Manderschied, he founded the publishing house Ultimomondo where his works now appear. In 2010, he published the novel Sibiresch Eisebunn under the penname Tania Naskandy.

Awards

Rewenig has received many awards in Luxembourg including the first prize for the Concours littéraire national in 1984, 1988 and 1991; the Batty Weber Prize in 2005; and the Prix Servais in 2006 and 2010.

External links
CNL page on Guy Rewenig with complete bibliography
Guy Rewenig at Ultimomondo

References

Luxembourgian writers
Luxembourgian novelists
1947 births
Living people
Luxembourgian schoolteachers
People from Luxembourg City
Alumni of the Athénée de Luxembourg